Parevander nietii is a species of beetle in the family Cerambycidae. It was described by Félix Édouard Guérin-Méneville in 1844.

References

Trachyderini
Beetles described in 1844